The following is a list of international organization leaders in 2005.

UN organizations

Political and economic organizations

Financial organizations

Sports organizations

Other organizations

See also
List of state leaders in 2005
List of religious leaders in 2005
List of colonial governors in 2005
List of international organization leaders in 2004
List of international organization leaders in 2006

References

2005
2005 in international relations
Lists of office-holders in 2005